Ilusión Nacional is a 2014 Mexican documentary film by Olallo Rubio about association football in Mexico.

Synopsis 
Olallo Rubio traces the history of association football in Mexico, and he discusses how it relates to Mexican politics and society.

Cast 
 Olallo Rubio

Production 
Co-producer José María Yazpik said that previously shot footage comprises the film's visual content, but there is footage that has never been seen before.

Release 
Ilusión Nacional was released in Mexico on June 4, 2014, and was timed to coincide with the 2014 FIFA World Cup.

Reception 
Eric Ortiz Garcia of Twitch Film called it "little more than a recap of Mexico's history in the World Cup" and Rubio's worst documentary to date.

References

Further reading

External links 
 

2014 films
2014 documentary films
Mexican documentary films
Documentary films about association football
Football in Mexico
2010s Mexican films